Acleistorhinus (ah-kles-toe-RYE-nuss) is an extinct genus of parareptile known from the Early Permian (middle Kungurian stage) of Oklahoma. It is notable for being the earliest known anapsid reptile yet discovered. The morphology of the lower temporal fenestra of the skull of Acleistorhinus bears a superficial resemblance to that seen in early synapsids, a result of convergent evolution. Only a single species, A. pteroticus, is known, and it is classified in the Family Acleistorhinidae, along with Colobomycter (also from the Early Permian of Oklahoma).

Etymology
Acleistorhinus was first discovered and named by Eleanor Daly in 1969 in the Hennessey Formation of South Grandfield, Tillman county, Oklahoma. The name Acleistorhinus combines Greek rhin (ῥῑ́ν), meaning "nose," and akleistos, Greek for “unclosed.“

Description and Paleobiology

Skull
Although its total body length is unknown, an Acleistorhinus skull is about 3.5 centimetres long. From the dorsal side, the Acleistorhinus skull appears to have a triangular outline. The surface of the skull is generally smooth with a few small, shallow circular pits. Anteriorly, the snout is gently rounded. The elliptical external nares are each bordered by the maxilla. The tooth bearing portion of the premaxilla appears to be directed somewhat downward at its tip. Each premaxilla possess spaces for four teeth. The maxilla has a dorsal expansion immediately behind the nares forming the entire posterier border of the opening. This configuration resembles that of the procolophonids, and turtles, and results in the exclusion of the lacrimal from the posterior border of the nares. Slightly more than one third of the total length of the skull is contributed by the frontal. It is constricted anteriorly by the prefrontals, but otherwise expanded above the orbits. Generally, in early amniotes the largest element was the occiput of the supraoccipital. In Acleistorhinus the supraoccipital is rather plate-like. The reduction in the overall size of the supraoccipital allows for the development of large post-termporal fenestra, a characteristic of Reptilia.

Dentition
The marginal dentition is composed of conical teeth that are slightly recurved. No canine region is evident although the second maxillary tooth is slightly larger than the rest. The tooth-bearing portion of the maxilla extends posterior to the orbit. All the premaxillary teeth appear to be approximately the same size, and noticeably smaller than those on the maxilla. The maxillae have 11 and 13 on the right and left sides respectively, there is room for at least 17 teeth for each element. Smaller teeth are present along the sloping surface of the transverse flange, anterior to the large row of teeth. On the parasphenoid plate, two separate paired rows of teeth diverge posteriorly. The lateral-most rows sit on a ridge that runs the length of the main body of the parasphenoid. The tooth ridges are evident anteriorly but appear to terminate at the same level as the teeth on the transverse flange of the pterygoid.

Habitat and Diet
The Early Permian is marked by terrestrial plant diversification, in which insects evolved rapidly as they followed the plants into new habitats. Acleistorhinus is widely believed to be an insectivore because its teeth are numerous, small and pointed. The back of the skull is wide resulting in the orbits being pushed forward. This would have offered a degree of binocular vision giving Acleistorhinus, a land-dwelling insectivore, depth perception necessary for hunting fast moving objects.

Classification and Species
The genus Acleistorhinus belongs to the taxon parareptilia along with Millerettidae, Lanthanosuchidae to whom it is a sister taxa, Macroleter and Procolophonia. As of present, there is only one known species of Acleistorhinus, known as Acleistorhinus pteroticus.

A recent restudy, phylogenetic analysis, of Acleistorhinus indicates that this Early Permian amniote from North America, the oldest known member of parareptilia, is a sister taxon to Russian Lanchanosuchidae. In addition, the results support Laurin and Reisz (1995) hypothesis that Parareptilia is a monophyletic group, while differing in the number of synapomorphies diagnosing the clade. The recognition of Acleistorhinus and lanthanosuchids as sister-taxa presents new evidence for the hypothesis that parareptiles had a cosmopolitan distribution during the Paleozoic. This sister-group relationship is supported by twelve synapomorphies. Furthermore, when acknowledging Acleistorhinus, lanthanosuchids, and Macroleter nest within Parareptilia, it becomes evident through specific interrelationships within Amniota that Parareptilia is a monophyletic taxon.

Using the tenet of minimum divergence time most recently discussed by Norell (1992) and Westphalian (1993), the earliest parareptile must extend into at least the Westphalian (stage) of the Upper Carboniferous. This suggests that the all major amniote clades Diapsida, Synapsida and Parareptilia all diverged early in the evolutionary radiation of amniotes. At the very least parareptiles are more diverse and possess a richer fossil record than previously recognized.

Discovery
Acleistorhinus was discovered by Daly in 1969, in the Early Permian outcrops of the Hennessey Formation, the locality of South Grandfield of southwestern Oklahoma. The Hennessey Formation is believed to be contemporaneous with the Richards Spur locality near Fort Sill, Oklahoma, as they both possess a mixed fauna, which is generally disarticulated and incomplete. In addition, over 200 skulls and 500 specimens have been collected from South Grandfield, only one specimen of Acleistorhinus is known. It is very likely that this taxon is an erratic and would not normally preserve in the depositional environment that characterizes much of the Lower Permian of North America.

The discovery of Acleistorhinus was far reaching because until the present only Synapida and Diapsida could trace their earliest known members to North America. Now parareptiles can also trace their earliest record from the same continent. It is very likely that all three major amniote clades Diapsida, Synapsida, and Parareptilia all diverged early during the evolutionary radiation that characterizes much of the Early Permian.

See also
 Macroleter
 Lanthanosuchidae
  Parareptilia
 Chordate
 Reptilia	
  Synapsids

References

External Source

More on parareptile
Helpful list of parareptilia phylogeny
Permian Period

Procolophonomorphs
Permian reptiles of North America
Prehistoric reptile genera